Lookouts is the plural of lookout, and may also refer to:

The Chattanooga Lookouts, a baseball team
The Lookouts, a punk band

See also 

 Lookout (disambiguation)